Ballure is a small hamlet about 0.75 mile southeast of Ramsey on the Isle of Man. A stop on the Manx Electric Railway which runs through it is the Ballure Halt (or Ballure Glen) station. The latter lies just to the south of the boundary of Ramsey, and thus lies in the ward (and traditional parish) of Maughold within the current administrative parish (and traditional sheading) of Garff.

Legend
Arthur William Moore reported that there was a sighting of the glashtin or Cabbyl-Ushtey, a water-horse of Manx legend at Ballure Glen in 1859.

References

Villages in the Isle of Man